Symphlebia aryllis is a moth in the subfamily Arctiinae. It was described by Schaus in 1896. It is found in Venezuela.

References

Moths described in 1896
aryllis